William T. Vitt House, also known as the Louis Schaefer House, is a historic home located at Washington, Franklin County, Missouri. It was built in 1888, and is a -story, three bay, side entry brick dwelling on a stone foundation. It has a side gable roof and segmental arched door and window openings.  It features a Victorian style front porch.

It was listed on the National Register of Historic Places in 2000.

References

Houses on the National Register of Historic Places in Missouri
Houses completed in 1888
Buildings and structures in Franklin County, Missouri
National Register of Historic Places in Franklin County, Missouri